Han Zenki (潘善琪, born October 7, 1977, also known as Pan Shanqi) is a professional Go player.

Biography 
Han was born in Taiwan in 1977. He became a professional Go player in 1996. In the same year, he was promoted to 2-dan. In 2000, he was promoted to 5-dan. He is currently at the 8-dan rank.

External links
GoBase Profile
Nihon Ki-in Profile (Japanese)

1977 births
Living people
Taiwanese Go players
Japanese people of Taiwanese descent